Blanford may refer to:

Places
 Blanford, Indiana, United States
 Blanford, Virginia (former town annexed by Petersburg, Virginia), United States

People with the surname
 Henry Francis Blanford (1834–1893), British meteorologist and palaeontologist
 William Thomas Blanford (1832–1905), English geologist and naturalist

See also
Battle of Blanford, a British victory during the American War of Independence
Blandford (disambiguation)